Roger Leandro Cedeño (born August 16, 1974) is a Venezuelan former professional baseball outfielder. He played 11 seasons in Major League Baseball (MLB) from 1995 to 2005 for the Los Angeles Dodgers, New York Mets, Houston Astros, Detroit Tigers, and St. Louis Cardinals.

Career
Cedeño was slated to be the heir apparent to veteran Dodger All-Star outfielder Brett Butler. However, after four seasons of mediocre play with the Dodgers, he was traded to the New York Mets on December 1, 1998 in a deal in which the Dodgers obtained Todd Hundley. In the 1999 season, Cedeño broke a Mets record by stealing 66 bases in a season (later broken by Jose Reyes). Besides his 66 stolen bases, Cedeño would bat .313, have an on-base percentage of .396, and a slugging percentage of .408. These would all turn out to be career bests. Following the season, on December 11 the Mets traded Cedeño to the Houston Astros as part of a deal to obtain Mike Hampton.

In May 2000, Cedeño broke his hand sliding headfirst into first base and would spend three months on the disabled list. Following the season, Cedeño would be involved in a December trade for the third consecutive year, this time going to the Detroit Tigers in a six player deal. 2001 would see Cedeño bat .293 and steal 55 bases, although he led the American League by being caught stealing 15 times. That winter would be the fourth year in a row he changed teams, returning to the Mets via free agency. The next three seasons would show further declines in Cedeño's stolen bases, 25 in 2002, 14 in 2003 and just 5 in 2004, while hitting in the .260s all three years. He was traded before the 2004 season to the St. Louis Cardinals for Wilson Delgado. Following a 2005 season that saw just 61 plate appearances, Cedeño was released by the Cardinals.

However, it was reported that the 6'1" player showed up to spring training weighing 274 pounds. He was released on March 23, 2007.

Cedeño finished his career with a .273 batting average, 40 home runs, 274 RBI and 213 stolen bases in 1100 games.

Causes
In 2016, Cedeno founded the Roger Cedeno Foundation in Aventura, Florida, an IRS designated 501 (c) (3) charitable organization Great Nonprofits Cedeno Foundation Profile and Fundacion Roger Cedeno in Venezuela to support organizations and programs to benefit youth and those most in need.

Personal life
Cedeño's nephew, Yangervis Solarte, played infield for the San Francisco Giants. Cedeño convinced his agent to take Solarte on  a client as a personal favor.

See also
 List of Major League Baseball career stolen bases leaders
 List of Major League Baseball players from Venezuela

References

External links

Roger Cedeno at SABR (Baseball Biography Project)
Roger Cedeno at Baseball Almanac
Roger Cedeno at Baseball Library
Roger Cedeno at Astros Daily
Roger Cedeno at Ultimate Mets Database
Roger Cedeno at Pura Pelota (Venezuelan Professional Baseball League)
Roger Cedeno Foundation at https://irs.gov

1974 births
Albuquerque Dukes players
Detroit Tigers players
Great Falls Dodgers players
Houston Astros players
Leones del Caracas players
Living people
Los Angeles Dodgers players
Major League Baseball outfielders
Major League Baseball players from Venezuela
Memphis Redbirds players
New Orleans Zephyrs players
New York Mets players
Sportspeople from Valencia, Venezuela
St. Louis Cardinals players
San Antonio Missions players
Venezuelan expatriate baseball players in the United States
Vero Beach Dodgers players